David Demerest Aitken (September 5, 1853 – May 26, 1930) was an American politician who served two terms as a U.S. Representative from the state of Michigan from 1893 to 1897. He also served as mayor of Flint, Michigan.

Early life
Aitken was born on a farm in Flint Township, Michigan in Genesee County.  His father, Robert P. Aitken, served in the Michigan House of Representatives 1865-1868. Aitken attended the district schools and the local high school in Flint. He taught in a district school of Genesee County in 1871-1872 and moved to New Jersey in 1872, where he was employed as a bookkeeper. He studied law in New York City, was admitted to the bar in 1878, and commenced practice in Flint.

Political life
He was Flint city clerk 1883-1886 and city attorney 1886-1890.  Aitken was elected as a Republican to the U.S. House of Representatives from the 6th District of Michigan for the 53rd and 54th Congresses, serving from March 4, 1893, to March 3, 1897. He was chairman of the House Committee on Mines and Mining in the 54th Congress. He was not a candidate for renomination, running instead for Governor of Michigan in 1896. After losing that election to Hazen S. Pingree, Aitken resumed the practice of law and also engaged in banking. He served as mayor of the City of Flint in 1905 and 1906.  He died in Flint on May 26, 1930, and is interred in his family's plot at historic Glenwood Cemetery in Flint.

His boyhood home at 1110 N. Linden Rd. in Flint Township, Michigan is listed on The National Register of Historic Places.

See also
The Robert P. Aitken House, built circa 1843 (David's boyhood home), which is listed on The National Register of Historic Places

References

External links

1853 births
1930 deaths
Mayors of Flint, Michigan
Republican Party members of the Michigan House of Representatives
Michigan lawyers
Republican Party members of the United States House of Representatives from Michigan
Burials at Glenwood Cemetery (Flint, Michigan)
19th-century American politicians
20th-century American politicians